The Battle of Britain Range is a group of mountains within the Allies Group of the Muskwa Ranges in northern British Columbia, Canada.
The Muskwa Ranges also include the Tower of London Range, Italy Range and Allied Leaders Range.  

The range trends from northeast to southwest.
About  of the range is covered by glaciers, which lie in the basins of the Churchill Creek, Racing River and Gataga River. Major peaks include the Churchill Peak, Exploration Peak and Lindisfarne Peak.
The names of the peaks commemorate the allied leaders in World War II, places where the leaders met, and battles in which Canadian troops served. 
Thus names include Mount Churchill, Mount Roosevelt, Teheran Mountain, Yalta Peak, Dieppe Mountain, Falaise Mountain and Ortona Mountain.

References
Citations

Sources

Mountain ranges of British Columbia
Ranges of the Canadian Rockies
Northern Interior of British Columbia